Lecanogaster chrysea is a species of clingfish only known from the Atlantic Ocean off of Ghana.  This species grows to a length of  SL.  This species is the only known member of its genus.

References
 

Gobiesocidae
Monotypic fish genera
Fish described in 1957